This is a list of qualifying teams in the 2022 NCAA Division I men's basketball tournament.  A total of 68 teams are entered into the tournament. Thirty-two of the teams qualified via automatic bids, usually earned by winning their conference tournaments, while the remaining 36 teams were selected via "at-large" bids, which are extended by the NCAA Selection Committee. Teams are seeded from 1 to 16 within each of the four regionals, while the Selection Committee also seeded the entire field from 1 to 68.

Automatic bids
A total of 32 automatic bids to the tournament are granted to the below listed conferences, normally to the team that wins the conference's championship tournament. Seeds listed reflect seeding within the conference tournaments. Runners-up in boldface later received at-large berths.

At-large bids

36 at-large teams were determined through the NCAA basketball tournament selection process.

Listed by region and seeding

*See First Four

Conferences with multiple bids

Bids by state

See also
2022 NCAA Division I women's basketball tournament qualifying teams

Notes

References

NCAA Division I men's basketball tournament qualifying teams
 
qualifying teams